Kofini dam is the oldest man-made dam still in use. It was constructed in 1260 B.C.E. It is located on the Lakissa River in Greece.

References

Dams in Greece